The Royal Brunei Armed Forces (RBAF); , (ABDB), is the collective term for all of the military forces of the sultanate of Brunei Darussalam.  The RBAF consists of three primary military branches; the Royal Brunei Land Forces (RBLF), the Royal Brunei Navy (RBN), and the Royal Brunei Air Force (RBAirF).

The head of the Royal Brunei Armed Forces is the supreme commander, and is held by the Sultan of Brunei, and the incumbent is Sultan Hassanal Bolkiah.  They are managed under the Ministry of Defence of Brunei.

Name
Upon inception, the Royal Brunei Armed Forces were originally known as the Brunei Malay Regiment (AMB). On , the word '' (Malay for 'Royal') was added to the title, hence it became known as the Royal Brunei Malay Regiment (AMDB).

Organisation

Branches
The Royal Brunei Armed Forces consists of three primary military branches.

Royal Brunei Land Forces

The Royal Brunei Land Forces (RBLF) ( – TDDB), is a brigade sized army formation which consists of three operational battalions and a support battalion.  The role of the Royal Brunei Land Forces is to maintain the security of Brunei, and to defend the sovereignty of the country.  Its main responsibility is to oppose any threat from within or outside the country, and to maintain peace and security in the country.  The Royal Brunei Land Forces is the largest of the three armed services of Brunei.

Royal Brunei Navy

The Royal Brunei Navy (RBN) ( – TLDB), is the naval defence force of Brunei Darrussalam.  It is a small but relatively well-equipped force, whose main responsibility is to conduct search and rescue (SAR) missions, and to deter and defend the Brunei sovereign waters against attack mounted by sea-borne forces.  The Royal Brunei Navy has an operating inventory of 36 ships or similar vessels.

Royal Brunei Air Force

The Royal Brunei Air Force (RBAirF) ( – TUDB), is a small, primarily helicopter-based air force which is tasked with supporting the other branches of the armed services, defending Bruneian air space, and carrying out search and rescue operations. It consists of a range of helicopters, formerly ten Bell 212, four Sikorsky S-70A-14 (now transferred to the Royal Malaysian Air Force), and a solitary Bell 214ST. The Bell 212s were replaced between 2013 to 2015 by twelve Poland-manufactured Sikorsky S-70i Blackhawks

The Royal Brunei Air Force fixed-wing inventory is limited to four Pilatus PC-7 Mk.II training aircraft and a solitary CASA/IPTN CN-235 transport aircraft.  On 14 July 2014, the Commander of the Royal Brunei Armed Forces announced plans to order the Lockheed Martin C-130J Super Hercules in the near future.  On 7 October 2014, Brunei purchased a single C-130J with spare parts and logistic support for 343 million dollars.  , the Royal Brunei Air Force operates twenty manned aircraft and four unmanned aerial vehicles (UAV).

Support Services
The Support Services of the Royal Brunei Armed Forces had the responsibility of providing support services to units in the RBAF in all aspects pertaining to their administration, security, health, logistics, communication, transportation, and technical equipment service support to all units in the Royal Brunei Armed Forces.  The Support Services of the Royal Brunei Armed Forces also worked closely with other units in the Royal Brunei Armed Forces to undergo and help co-ordinate military training and operations.  As part of the reorganisation of the RBAF, the Support Services was disbanded in early 2009, and its various units were relocated.

Bands
It originally had 21 members, and was then badged as the regimental band of the Royal Brunei Malay Regiment. On , Major Haji Manaf bin Kamis became the first local musician to be appointed Director of Music. Kamis was the judge at a competition which chose the official anthem of ASEAN. Since 2003, it has been led by Major Awg Jaya bin Metussin. It has participated in events such as the Edinburgh Military Tattoo, the Brunei Darussalam International Tattoo, and the Berlin Military Music Festival. The RBAF Band first participated in the Hari Merdeka celebrations and the Kuala Lumpur International Tattoo in Malaysia in 2007, and has since become a regular participant.

The 2nd and 3rd Battalion Royal Brunei Land Forces Pipes and Drums are also part of the larger RBAF Band, and are more modelled on those of the British Army Brigade of Gurkhas, which station a battalion in rotation in Brunei.  Bands are also maintained in the Navy and the Air Force.

Affiliated to the RBAF Band is the Band of the Armed Forces Military Cadet Corps.

Training Institute

The Training Institute of the Royal Brunei Armed Forces is also known as the Military Training Institution.  It provides basic military training to all new recruits to the Royal Brunei Armed Forces.  Other military courses are also offered and conducted in the institution to personnel of the Royal Brunei Armed Forces.

Recruitment
Only Brunei citizens of the Malay ethnicity (Bumiputera) are allowed to enlist in the Royal Brunei Armed Forces.  The Malay ethnicity comprises the Belait, Bisaya, Brunei, Dusun, Kedayan, Murut, and Tutong indigenous races, as defined in the Brunei constitution.  Military service is not compulsory for any segment of the population; there is no conscription.  Both women and men work in the military.

The Royal Brunei Armed Forces (RBAF) Military Cadet should not be confused with the RBAF Military Cadets of Higher Institutions (not officially members) despite sharing the same name.  They could be identified by the uniforms they are wearing (the old woodland camouflage for the higher institutions, while the official Military cadets wear digital camouflage).

Miscellaneous
The Royal Brunei Armed Forces (RBAF) use a wide range of foreign equipment, with a large percentage originating from the United Kingdom, France/Europe, and the United States of America.  The Bruneian military lacks any recent combat experience, but has been deployed regionally in humanitarian and peacekeeping missions.  Notably, since 2004, the Royal Brunei Armed Forces have formed part of the peacekeeping mission in Mindanao, the Philippines.  Brunei also has extensive military relations with Singapore.

31 May is the Armed Forces Day of Brunei, which celebrates the founding of the Royal Brunei Armed Forces.  It is an annual national holiday, and the events on the day include military parade in front of the Sultan, and public exhibition of its equipment and armament.  On 31 May 2011, Royal Brunei Armed Forces celebrated its golden jubilee.

See also

Military forces based in Brunei
Training Institute Royal Brunei Armed Forces
Defence Academy Royal Brunei Armed Forces
Military Police Royal Brunei Armed Forces
Special Forces Regiment
Royal Brunei Malay Reserve Regiment
Gurkha Reserve Unit
National Service Programme

References

Further reading

External links

Ministry of Defence, Brunei — official website

 
Government agencies of Brunei
Government of Brunei